Theodoxus euxinus is a species of small freshwater snail with a gill and an operculum, an aquatic gastropod mollusk in the family Neritidae, the nerites.

Distribution 
The distribution of this species includes:
 Ukraine
 Romania
 Greece

The type locality is Dobrogea, Romania.

Description
The shell is shiny, smooth, with a coarse white ziczac pattern. The width of the shell is 6–8 mm.

Ecology
This species occurs in woodlands of the Danube Delta region, on rocks, and on sandy or muddy substrates.

References
This article incorporates public domain text from the reference

Neritidae
Molluscs of Europe
Gastropods described in 1886